Terri & Monica was an R&B duo from the early 1990s which featured Terri Robinson (August 12, 1970) and Monica Payne (February 22, 1969), who were members of the short-lived late 1980s New Jack Swing R&B group The Gyrlz along with third member Tara Geter.

As members of The Gyrlz, they released one album for Uptown Records under distribution from Capitol Records- 1988's Love Me or Leave Me.

After Geter left the group, Robinson and Payne continued on as a duo.  They released a pair of full-length recordings, 1993's Systa and 1996's Suga, both released via Epic Records. The latter spawned a Billboard Magazine hit single, "Sexuality (If You Take Your Love)."

Discography
As The Gyrlz
1988: Love Me or Leave Me

As Terri & Monica
1993: Systa
1996: Suga

Contributions, compilations, and collaborations 
 "I've Been Waiting" a track from their 1993 debut was featured on the soundtrack to Poetic Justice, a motion picture starring Janet Jackson and Tupac Shakur. Another hit single, "Uh-Huh", was featured on Hey Mr. DJ: The 4th Compilation as a remix from Mood II Swing.
 In 1993, Terri and Monica sang the hook on Heavy D's "Truthful".
 The performed alongside Shabba Ranks and Patra on "Family Affair". The song, a revision of the 1971 hit single from Sly & the Family Stone, was featured on the Addams Family Values motion picture soundtrack.
 In the 1990s, Terri Robinson contributed background vocals to both theme songs on the television series In Living Color.
 In 1995, the duo performed with LL Cool J on the tracks "Hip-Hop" and "Loungin"' from LL Cool J's 1995 album Mr. Smith. They also made a contribution to the Money Train motion picture soundtrack.
 Terri Robinson worked behind the scenes as a background vocalist and songwriter on albums by Total, Soul for Real, Monifah, Al B. Sure! and Mary J. Blige among others. Robinson also contributed background vocals on the Pete Rock & CL Smooth single "Lots of Lovin'" from their debut album Mecca and the Soul Brother. 
 Monica Payne's last studio appearance was on the soundtrack to the Will Smith film Wild Wild West, singing the hook to the Tim & Bob produced MC Lyte song "Keep It Movin'". Payne is currently the manager of V. Bozeman, a singer signed to Timbaland's record label Mosley Music Group.
 As of 2021, Monica Payne is a label executive for Max Gousse's Warner Records distributed label, Artistry Worldwide - home to American rapper Saweetie.

References

External links 
Terri & Monica: earthy girl group – rap group April 1994 Essence article

Terri & Monica artist information at Discogs

American hip hop groups
Women hip hop groups
American girl groups